A Lenten sacrifice is a spiritually motivated voluntary renunciation of a pleasure or luxury that most Christians (especially Catholics, Lutherans, Anglicans, Methodists, Moravians and the United Protestants) give up for the observance of Lent, which starts on Ash Wednesday. The tradition of Lent has its roots in Jesus Christ praying and fasting for forty days in the desert according to the gospels of Matthew, Mark and Luke. When Lent is over and Easter Sunday arrives, the faithful are able to indulge in what they sacrificed during the Lenten season.

Christian denominations often set certain requirements for the practice of fasting, such as those found in Pope Paul VI's apostolic constitution Paenitemini in the Catholic Church and the Book of Common Prayer in Anglicanism, for example. In addition to observing special laws regarding fasting, other forms of asceticism and penance are also recommended. The faithful are encouraged to practice prayer more intensively and to take part more in church services and devotions (e.g. the Way of the Cross). Likewise, they should do more works of mercy and give alms. Such a penance or a good work, like a tangible financial donation given as an offering during Lent, is called a Lenten sacrifice.

Common Lenten sacrifices include abstaining from pleasures such as coffee, chocolate, sugar, sweets, alcohol, soda or social media. Some Christians choose to practice temperance throughout the Lenten season, thus giving up alcoholic beverages; in light of this, temperance drinks experience a surge of popularity during the Lenten season. Others, on the first day of Lent, pledge to give up sinful behaviours, such as using profanity, and hope to permanently rid themselves of these habits even after the arrival of Eastertide. While making a Lenten sacrifice, it is customary for Christians to pray for strength to keep it; many often wish others for doing so as well, e.g. "May God bless your Lenten sacrifice."

Many Christians sacrifice the eating of meat and commit to vegetarianism for the entire Lenten season. It is commonplace for many Christians (especially Roman Catholics, Lutherans, Anglicans, and Methodists) to observe the Friday Fast throughout Lent, which includes abstaining from meat on the Fridays of Lent. 

Some Christian clergy, both Roman Catholic and Methodist, have encouraged the faithful not to give up social media for Lent as they believe that Christians can use social media for evangelism. 

In addition to making their Lenten sacrifice, many Christians choose to add a Lenten spiritual discipline, such as reading a daily devotional or praying through a Lenten calendar, to draw themselves nearer to God.

See also 

Black Fast
Christian Vegetarian Association
Pioneer Total Abstinence Association

References

External links 
Could you go alcohol-free for Lent? - The United Methodist Church
Veg for Lent - Christian Vegetarian Association
Some Christians Give Up Alcohol for Lent - The Christian Post
Lenten Devotions - Lutheran Hour Ministries
After Giving up Alcohol, I’m Addicted to Lent - Sojourners
102 Things You Should Really Give Up For Lent - Life Teen

Christian fasting
Lent